Youth of the European People's Party (YEPP) is an umbrella organization of European political youth organisations and is the official youth wing of the European People's Party. YEPP brings together 64 Centre-Right youth political organisations from 40 countries all over Europe. Founded in 1997 by the 2006–2014 Prime Minister of Sweden Fredrik Reinfeldt, YEPP has developed into the largest political youth organisation in Europe.

Full members status is held to the European Youth Forum (YFJ) which operates within the Council of Europe and European Union areas and works closely with both these bodies (full members status to the European Youth Forum has also Democrat Youth Community of Europe, whose senior branch merged into the European People's Party in 2002). YEPP is also a full member of the Union of the Robert Schuman Institute for Developing Democracy in Central and Eastern Europe. Every board is elected for two years.

List of presidents 
 Fredrik Reinfeldt (Sweden), 1997–1999
 Michael Hahn (Germany), 1999–2001
 Rutger-Jan Hebben (Netherlands), 2001–2003
 Daniel Bautista (Spain), 2003–2005
 David Hansen (Norway), 2005–2007
 Ioannis Smyrlis (Greece), 2007–2009
 Laurent Schouteten (France), 2009–2011
 Csaba Dömötör (Hungary), 2011–2013
 Konstantinos Kyranakis (Greece), 2013–2017
 Andrianos Giannou (Romania), 2017–2018
 Lídia Pereira (Portugal), 2018–Present

Board members (2021–2023) 
YEPP President
 Lídia PEREIRA (JSD, Portugal)

YEPP Secretary General
 Kevin MAAS (Jong CD&V, Belgium)

YEPP First Vice-president
 Christian ZOLL (Junge ÖVP, Austria)

YEPP Deputy Secretary General
 Silva MERTSOLA (KNL, Finland)

YEPP Treasurer
 Vassilis SAKELLARIS (ONNED, Greece)

YEPP Vice-presidents
 Martin HALLANDER (KDU, Sweden)
 Regina FRIESER (JU, Germany)
 Edelmira FERRI HERNANDEZ (NNGG, Spain)
 Vít MIKUŠEK (ML, Czech Republic)
 Zarja BREGANT (SDM, Slovenia)
 Mara MAREŞ (TNL, Romania)
 Marco PARROCCINI (FIG, Italy)
 Nikola ERIC (UM SNS, Serbia)
 Paula CAMPBELL (YFG, Ireland)

Financial Auditors
 Carol DE BIAGI (GDC, San Marino) 
 Gianluca SCIBERRAS (MZPN, Malta)

Board members (2018–2021) 
 YEPP President Lídia Pereira (JSD, Portugal)
 YEPP Secretary General Eileen Lynch (YFG, Ireland)
 YEPP First Vice-president Stephen Beer (JU, Germany)
 YEPP Deputy Secretary General Christina Balaska (ONNED, Greece)
 YEPP Treasurer Ali-Reza Abdali  (KNL, Finland)
 YEPP Vice-presidents: Ágnes Zsofia Magyar (Fidelitas, Hungary), Mara Mares (TNL, Romania), Nikola Eric (UM SNS, Serbia), Martin Hallander (KDU, Sweden), Christian Zoll (Junge ÖVP, Austria), Zsombor Ambrus (MIERT, Romania), Karlo Ressler (MHDZ, Croatia), Marcello Gamberale (FIG, Italy), Tino Schneider (JCVP, Switzerland)

Board members (2017–2018) 
 YEPP President Andrianos Giannou (TNL, Romania)
 YEPP Secretary General Maru Pardal (NNGG, Spain)
 YEPP First Vice-president Jim Lefebre (Junge ÖVP, Austria)
 YEPP Deputy Secretary General Lotte Schipper (CDJA, The Netherlands)
 YEPP Treasurer Pierre-Henri Dumont (JR, France)
 YEPP Vice-presidents: Ágnes Zsofia Magyar (Fidelitas, Hungary), Christina Balaska (ONNED, Greece), Eileen Lynch (YFG, Ireland), Arba Kokalari (MUF, Sweden), Ana Lidia Pereira (JSD, Portugal), Inna Korsun (YDA, Ukraine), Karlo Ressler (MHDZ, Croatia), Marcello Gamberale Paoletti (FIG, Italy), Stephan Beer (JU, Germany)

Board members (2015–2017) 
 YEPP President Konstantinos Kyranakis (ONNED, Greece)
 YEPP First Vice-president Roland Mittmann (JU, Germany)
 YEPP Secretary General Andrea Vodanović (MHDZ, Croatia)
 YEPP Deputy Secretary General Christodoulos Ioannou (NEDISY, Cyprus)
 YEPP Treasurer Maru Pardal (NNGG, Spain)
 YEPP Vice-presidents: Bartosz Domaszewicz (SMD, Poland), Pierre-Henri Dumont (JR, France), Csaba Faragó (Fidelitas, Hungary), Andrianos Giannou (TDL, Romania), Arba Kokalari (MUF, Sweden), João Paulo Meireles (JSD, Portugal), Riccardo Pozzi (GUDC, Italy), Stefan Schnöll (JVP, Austria), Tore Storehaug (KrFU, Norway)

Board members (2013–2015) 
 YEPP President Konstantinos Kyranakis (ONNED, Greece)
 YEPP Secretary General Colm Lauder (YFG, Ireland)
 YEPP First Vice-president Juha-Pekka Nurvala (KNL, Finland)
 YEPP Deputy Secretary General Federico Potočnik (MSI, Slovenia)
 YEPP Treasurer Frank Visser (CDJA, Netherlands)
 YEPP Vice-presidents: Stefan Schnöll (Junge ÖVP, Austria) Tom Vandenkendelaere (JONG CD&V, Belgium) Hristo Gadzhev (MGERB, Bulgaria) Christodoulos Ioannou (NEDISY, Cyprus) Linda Eichler (IRLY, Estonia) Benedict Pöttering (JU, Germany) Riccardo Pozzi (Giovani UDC, Italy) Joao Paolo Meirelles (JSD, Portugal) Sara Skyttedal (KDU, Sweden)

Board members (2011–2013) 
 YEPP President  Csaba Dömötör (Fidelitas, Hungary)
 YEPP Secretary General Juha-Pekka Nurvala (KNL, Finland)
 YEPP First Vice-president Duarte Marques (JSD, Portugal)
 YEPP Deputy Secretary General Colm Lauder (YFG, Ireland)
 YEPP Treasurer Frank Lambermont (CDJA, Netherlands)
 YEPP Vice-presidents: Reinhard Bärnthaler (Junge OVP, Austria), Charalambos Stavrides (NEDISY, Cyprus), Benedict Pöttering (JU, Germany), Konstantinos Kyranakis (ONNED, Greece), Emanuele Occhipinti (GL, Italy), Gunārs Elksnis (YLPP, Latvia), Ryan Callus (MZPN, Malta), Andrea Levy Soler (NNGG, Spain), Sara Skyttedal (KDU, Sweden)
 YEPP Financial Auditors: Oliver Jung (Jeunes cdH, Belgium), Riccardo Pozzi (Giovani UDC, Italy)

Board members (2009–2011) 
 YEPP President Laurent Schouteten (Jeunes UMP, France)
 YEPP Secretary General Carlo De Romanis (FIG, Italy)
 YEPP First Vice-president Thomas Schneider (JU, Germany)
 YEPP Deputy Secretary General Brenda Furniere (Belgium)
 YEPP Treasurer Julian Farner-Calvert's (KRFU, Norway)
 YEPP Vice-presidents: Caesar Andres (JCVP, Switzerland), Gernot Blümel (Junge ÖVP, Austria), Csaba Dömötör (Fidelitas, Hungary), Paula Gomez de la Barcena Anserona (NN.GG, Spain), Melita Kelenc (MSI, Slovenia), Anatolii Korol (DA, Ukraine), Duarte Marques (JSD, Portugal), Juha-Pekka Nurvala (KNL, Finland), Bronne Pot (CDJA, Netherlands)
 YEPP Financial Auditors Petr Jurčík (MKD, Czech Republic), Michael Clancy (YFG, Ireland)

Board members (2007–2009) 
 YEPP President Yannis Smyrlis (ONNED, Greece)
 YEPP Secretary General Martin Hümer (JVP, Austria)
 YEPP First Vice-president Thomas Schneider (JU, Germany)
 YEPP Deputy Secretary General Huibert van Rossum (CDJA, Netherlands)
 YEPP Treasurer Sigbjørn Aanes (UHL, Norway)
 YEPP Vice-presidents: Irina Pruidze (AME, Georgia), Laurent Schouteten (Jeunes UMP, France), Carlo de Romanis (FIG, Italy), James Lawless (YFG, Ireland), Vaidas Augunas (JKD, Lithuania), Paula Gómez de la Bárcena Ansorena (NNGG, Spain), Daniel Fangueiro (JSD, Portugal), Charlie Weimers (KDU, Sweden), Darija Jurica (MHDZ, Croatia)

Board members (2005–2007) 
 YEPP President David Hansen (KrFU, Norway)
 YEPP Secretary General Martin Hümer (JVP, Austria)
 YEPP First Vice-president Robert Golanski (MD, Poland)
 YEPP Deputy Secretary General Huibert van Rossum (CDJA, Netherlands)
 YEPP Vice-presidents: David Cermak (MKD, Czech Republic), Paula Gómez de la Bárcena Ansorena (NNGG, Spain), Galina Fomenchenko (CDMU, Ukraine), Christian Holm (MUF, Sweden), Christoph Israng (JU, Germany), Stefano Morelli (FIG, Italy), Vincent Richez (Jeunes Populaires, France), Yannis Smyrlis (ONNED, Greece), Jeroen van den Berghe (Jong CD&V, Belgium)

Board members (2003–2005) 
 YEPP President Daniel Bautista (NNGG, Spain)
 YEPP Secretary General Riika Railimo (former Kervinen) (KNL, Finland)
 YEPP First Vice-president Markus Pösentrup (JU, Germany)
 YEPP Deputy Secretary General Lucinda Creighton (YFG, Ireland)
 YEPP Vice-presidents: Paolo Zanetto (FIG, Italy), Bernhard Pircher (JVP Austria), Maria Syrengela (ONNED, Greece), Arnoud Strijbis (CDJA, Netherlands), Arnt Kennis (Jong CD&V, Belgium), John Bonello (MZPN, Malta), Timotej Neubauer (NG SLS, Slovenia), Pedro Duarte (JSD, Portugal)

Board members (2001–2003) 
 YEPP President Rutger-Jan Hebben (CDJA, Netherlands)
 YEPP Secretary General Markus Pösentrup (JU, Germany)
 YEPP First Vice-president Daniel Bautista (NNGG, Spain)
 YEPP Deputy Secretary General Riika Railimo (former Kervinen) (KNL, Finland)
 YEPP Vice-presidents: Sidonia Jedrzejewska (MD, Poland), Maria Syrengela (ONNED, Greece), Aidas Palubinskas (JKD, Lithuania), Arnt Kennis (Jong CD&V, Belgium), Alex Widmer (JCVP, Switzerland), Miguel Coleta (JSD, Portugal), David Hansen (KrFU, Norway), Leo Varadkar (YFG, Ireland), Alessia Mosca (UDC, Italy)

Board members (1999-2001) 
 YEPP President Michael Hahn (JU, Germany)
 YEPP Secretary General Rutger-Jan Hebben (CDJA, Netherlands)
 YEPP First Vice-president Belen Ureña (NNGG, Spain)
 YEPP Deputy Secretary General Eva Mitsopoulou (ONNED, Greece)
 YEPP Vice-presidents: Niklas Claesson (MUF, Sweden), Yannick Georges (Jeunes PSC, Belgium), Sidonia Jedrzejewska (MD, Poland), Jyrki Katainen (KNL, Finland), Stephen McCullen (YFG, Ireland), Aidas Palubinskas (JKD, Lithuania), Alina Bita (PNTCD-OT, Romania), Martin Ledolter (JVP, Austria), José Eduarto Martins (JSD, Portugal)

Board members (1997-1999) 
 YEPP President Fredrik Reinfeldt (MUF, Sweden)
 YEPP Secretary General Walter Verbeke (CVP-Jongeren, Belgium)
 YEPP First Vice-president Winfried Weck (JU, Germany)
 YEPP Deputy Secretary General Jan-Kees de Jager (CDJA, Netherlands)
 YEPP Vice-presidents: Joanne Harmon (YFG, Ireland), Eva Mitsopoulou (ONNED, Greece), André Støylen (UHL, Norway), Belen Ureña (NNGG, Spain), Martin Ledolter (JVP, Austria), Evarts Anosovs (Former LKDJS, Latvia), Yannick Georges (Jeunes PSC, Belgium), Mikolaj Dowgielewicz (MD, Poland), Peter Stach (KDMS, Slovakia), José Eduarto Martins (JSD, Portugal)

Member organisations 

Youth Forum of the Democratic Party (FR-PD)

Junge ÖVP

Young Front
Youth Christian-Social Union Young Democrats (YCSU-YD)

Jeunes cdH
JONG Christen-Democratisch & Vlaams (JONGCD&V)

Youth SDA

Youth Union of the Democratic Party (MSDP)
Youth Union of Democratic Forces (MSDS)

Youth of the Croatian Democratic Union (Mladež Hrvatske demokratske zajednice; MHDZ)

Youth Organisation of Democratic Rally (NE.DI.SY)

Young Populars (Mladí lidovci, ML)
TOP Team (TOP tým)

Young Conservatives (Konservativ Ungdom; KU)

IRL Noored

Christian Democratic Youth of Finland (Suomen Kristillisdemokraattiset Nuoret, KDN)
Youth League of the Coalition Party (Kokoomuksen Nuorten Liitto; KNL)

Les Jeunes Républicains

Young National Democrats of Georgia (Akhalgazrda Erovnul-Demokrati)
Georgian Youth Christian-Democratic Association (SAQDA)
The Young Rights – AME (Akhalgazrda Memarjveneebi)

Junge Union (JU)

Youth Organisation of New Democracy (ΟΝΝΕΔ/ONNED)

Young Christian Democratic Union (IKSZ)

Young Fine Gael (YFG)

Forza Italia Giovani (FIG)
Youth of the Christian-Democratic Union (UDC)
Youth of the Democratic Union for Europe (UDeuR)
Junge Generation, Youth of the South Tyrolean People's Party (JG)

Unity Youth Organisation (Vienotības Jaunatnes organizācija; VJO)

Young Christian Democrats (Jaunieji krikščionys demokratai; JKD)

Christian-Social Youth of Luxemburg (Chrëschtlech-Sozial Jugend; CSJ)

Union of young forces (ВМРО – Демократска партија за Македонско национално единство; VMRO-DPMNE)

Youth Movement of the Nationalist Party (Moviment Żgħażagħ Partit Nazzjonalista; MZPN)

New Generation of the Christian-Democratic People's Party (NG PPCD)

Christian-Democratic Youth Movement (CDJA)

Norwegian Young Conservatives (Unge Høyres Landsforbund; UHL)
Norwegian Young Christian Democrats (Kristelig Folkepartis Ungdom; KrFU)

Young Democrats Association (Stowarzyszenie/MD)

Social Democratic Youth (Portugal) (Juventude Social Democrata; JSD)
People's Youth (Portugal) (Juventude Popular; JP)

Tineretul Democrat Liberal (TDL)

Christian Democratic Youth of San Marino (GDC)

Youth Union (Serbian Progressive Party)

Christian Democratic Youth of Slovakia (KDMS)

New Generation of the Slovenian People's Party (Nova generacija SLS; NG SLS)
Slovenian democratic youth (SDM)
Young Slovenia (Mlada Slovenija; MSi)

New Generations of the People's Party of Spain (NNGG)
Union of Christian-Democratic Youth of Catalonia (UFDCC)

 Young Christian Democrats (Kristdemokratiska ungdomsförbundet; KDU)
 Moderate Youth League (Moderata ungdomsförbundet; MUF)

Youth of the Christian-Democratic People's Party of Switzerland (Junge Christlichdemokratische Volkspartei der Schweiz; JCVP)

Batkivshchyna moloda
Democratic Alliance (DA)
Young Rukh

References

External links 
 Official YEPP website
 YEPP 15 Years Yearbook - Wilfried Martens Centre for European Studies

European Union youth policy
People's Party, Youth of the European
European People's Party